is a railway station in the city of Nikkō, Tochigi, Japan, operated by the East Japan Railway Company (JR East).

Lines

Station layout
The station consists of two opposed side platform, connected to the station building by a footbridge. The station is unattended.

Platforms

History
Shimotsuke-Ōsawa Station opened on 1 November 1929. On 1 April 1987 the station came under the control of JR East with the privatization of the Japan National Railways (JNR). A new station building was completed in 2010.

Surrounding area
 Shimotsuke-Ōsawa Post Office

See also
 List of railway stations in Japan

External links

  JR East Station information 

Railway stations in Tochigi Prefecture
Nikkō Line
Stations of East Japan Railway Company
Railway stations in Japan opened in 1929
Nikkō, Tochigi